Philip Klein is an American film and television composer and orchestrator. He is best known for scoring Wish Dragon, Pig, and The Last Full Measure.

Life and career
Klein was born in Batavia, New York, and studied trumpet and composition at Northwestern University. In 2011, he was selected to be a Fellow at the Sundance Institute Composers Lab. He has collaborated with composers including Harry Gregson-Williams, Carter Burwell, James Newton Howard, Ludwig Göransson, Fil Eisler, and Alex Heffes.

Selected filmography
As composer

As orchestrator

 2022 – Fantastic Beasts: The Secrets of Dumbledore
 2022 – Turning Red
 2021 – Jungle Cruise
 2021 – Raya and the Last Dragon
 2020 – News of the World

 2019 – The Mandalorian
 2019 – Joker
 2018 – Fantastic Beasts: The Crimes of Grindelwald
 2016 – Fantastic Beasts and Where to Find Them
 2016 – The Finest Hours

Awards and nominations

References

External links
 
 

American film score composers
American television composers
Living people
American male film score composers
Male television composers
Animation composers
Year of birth missing (living people)